Ballston Spa National Bank is one of the oldest American banks founded in 1838 and located in Ballston Spa, Saratoga County, New York.

The bank services include:

checking accounts
savings and money market accounts
health savings accounts
certificates of deposit (CDs), etc.

In August 2015 was opened its 11th branch, the first office in Albany County located in Latham and focused on the business clients.

References

External links 
Homepage
Book The history of Ballston Spa National Bank, 1838-1988

Banks based in New York (state)
American companies established in 1838
1838 establishments in New York (state)
Banks established in 1838